This is a list of Gaelic games clubs across the world outside Ireland, organised by the club's associated county (the name for a unit in which a club is grouped).

Gaelic games clubs exist on every continent.

Common abbreviations used in club names are:
 CC: Camogie Club or Cumann Camogaíochta
 CLG: Cumann Lútchleas Gael (Gaelic Athletic Club, or Gaelic Athletic Association)
 CPG: Cumann Peile Gaelach (Gaelic Football Club)
 GAA: Gaelic Athletic Association (now often used for individual clubs)
 GAC: Gaelic Athletic Club (often denotes that more than one sport is played)
 GFC: Gaelic Football Club
 HC: Hurling Club
 HCC: Hurling and Camogie Club
 LGFC: Ladies' Gaelic Football Club

Africa

South Africa
 SA Gaels
 Zulu Gaels

Uganda
 Uganda GAA

Asia

Myanmar
 The Celts (Myanmar Celts Gaelic Sports Association)
 Cairde Khmer GAA

China
 Beijing GAA
 Dalian Wolfhounds
 Lantau Warriors
 Shanghai GAA, China
 Shenzhen Celts, China
 Suzhou Éire Óg
 Hong Kong GAA

Indonesia
 Jakarta Dragonflies

Japan
 Japan GAA

South Korea
 Daegu Fianna
 Laochra Busan
 Seoul Gaels

Thailand
 Thailand GAA

Malaysia
 Orang Eire GAA
 Johor Bahru GAA

Singapore
 Singapore Gaelic Lions

Taiwan
 Taiwan Celts

Vietnam
 Viet Celts Hanoi
 Saigon Gaels
 Na Fianna

Australasia

Australia

New Zealand

Britain

London

Hertfordshire

Gloucestershire
 Western Gaels GAC of Bristol
 Plymouth Parnells
 Crawley/Brighton Gaels
 St Nicks (Bristol)
 St Colmcilles (Cardiff)
 St Judes ( Bournemouth , Southampton)
 St Pirans ( Cornwall)
 Pride of Erin (Newport)

Lancashire

Warwickshire

Yorkshire

Wales
 St Colmcille's, Cardiff
 Pride Of Erin, Newport

Scotland
 Dálriada, Aberdeen/Dundee
 Dúnedin Connollys, Edinburgh
 Glaschu Gaels, Glasgow
 Sands MacSwineys, Coatbridge
 Tír Conaill Harps, Glasgow
 Ceann Creige Hurling and Camogie Club, Glasgow

Isle Of Man
 Ellan Vannin Gaels

Jersey
 Jersey Irish

Gibraltar
 Gibraltar Gaels
 Gibraltar Harps (Christmas Cup Winners 2018)

Continental Europe
These are the 95 affiliated clubs as at May 2019.

Middle East

Bahrain
 Arabian Celts

Kuwait
 Kuwait Harps

Oman
 Clann na hOman GAA

Qatar
 Qatar GAA (Oryx na hEireann)

Saudi Arabia
 Naomh Alee GAA Riyadh

United Arab Emirates
 Abu Dhabi Na Fianna
 Al Ain
 Al Reem Shamrocks
 Dubai Celts
 Jumeirah Gaels
 RAK Ropairí
 Ruwais Gaels
 Sharjah Gaels
 Eire Og Fujairah

North America

Canada

Eastern GAA Divisional Board
 Halifax Gaels GAA | Halifax, Nova Scotia
 Avalon Harps | St John's, Newfoundland
 Montreal Shamrocks GAC | Montreal, Québec
 Ottawa "Eire Og" Hurling Club | Ottawa, Ontario
 Ottawa Gaels GFC | Ottawa, Ontario
 Les Patriotes de Québec | Québec city, Québec
 PEI Celts | Prince Edward Island

Toronto GAA Divisional Board

Western Canada GAA Divisional Board

New York

Minor Teams in New York

United States

Northeast Division

Southwestern Division

Philadelphia Division

Mid-Atlantic Division

Central Division

Western Division

Southeast Division

Mid-West Division

North Western Division

Bermuda
 Bermuda G.A.A.

South America

Argentina
 Hurling Club of Buenos Aires
 San Isidro Gaélico
 Club Atlético San Isidro 
 Labardén
 Bulfin G.A.A.

References

Outside
Outside